Dionysus-Osiris, or alternatively, Osiris-Dionysus, is a deity that arises from the syncretism of the Egyptian god Osiris and the Greek god Dionysus. As early as the 5th century BC, the two deities had been identified with each other, seen most notably in the historian Herodotus' Histories:

Other syncretic Greco-Egyptian deities arose out of these conflations, such as Serapis and Hermanubis. Dionysus-Osiris was particularly popular in Ptolemaic Egypt, as the Ptolemies claimed descent from Dionysus, and as pharaohs they had claim to the lineage of Osiris. This association was most notable during a deification ceremony where Mark Antony became Dionysus-Osiris, alongside Cleopatra as Isis-Aphrodite.

In the controversial book The Jesus Mysteries, Osiris-Dionysus is claimed to be the basis of Jesus as a syncretic dying-and-rising god, with early Christianity beginning as a Greco-Roman mystery. The book and its "Jesus Mysteries thesis" have not been accepted by mainstream scholarship, with Bart Ehrman stating that the work is unscholarly.

See also
 Dionysus in comparative mythology
 Dying-and-rising god
Antinous as Dionysus
Greek god of wine, Dionysus

References

Hellenistic Egyptian deities
Life-death-rebirth gods
Greco-Roman mysteries
Dionysus
Osiris